The British Beer and Pub Association is the drinks and hospitality industry's largest and most influential trade association  representing some 90% of UK brewing (by volume) and the ownership of around 20,000 of the nation's pubs.

History
The Association was founded in 1904 as the Brewers' Society, was for a period in the 1990s known as the Brewers and Licensed Retailers Association before becoming the British Beer & Pub Association in 2000 to reflect its growing pub company membership.

See also
 British Institute of Innkeeping Awarding Body
 Campaign for Real Ale

References

External links
British Beer and Pub Association website
Catalogue of the BBPA archives, held at the Modern Records Centre, University of Warwick

Beer in the United Kingdom
Business organisations based in London
Food industry trade groups based in the United Kingdom
Hospitality industry in the United Kingdom
Organizations established in 1904
1904 establishments in the United Kingdom